Thomas Forrest (1747March 20, 1825) was an American politician. He was member of the 16th Session of the United States Congress, and first chairman of the United States House Committee on Agriculture. He fought in the Continental Army as an artillery officer during the American Revolutionary War.

Career
Forrest was born in Philadelphia in the Province of Pennsylvania.  During the American Revolutionary War was commissioned a captain in Colonel Thomas Proctor's Pennsylvania Artillery Battalion on October 5, 1776. He led a 52-man company of artillery at the Battle of Trenton on December 26, 1776. Situated on high ground at the head of King and Queen Streets, his two brass 6-pound cannons and other American guns helped dominate the battlefield. He was promoted to major on March 3, 1777 and lieutenant colonel on December 2, 1778.  He resigned October 7, 1781.
 
Forrest was elected as a Federalist to the 16th Congress. He served as the first chairman of the House Committee on Agriculture, after it was created on May 3, 1820. Seven representatives, under the chairmanship of Forrest, were assigned to the new committee.

He was again elected as a Federalist to the 17th Congress to fill the vacancy caused by the resignation of William Milnor.  He was an unsuccessful candidate for reelection in 1822.

He died in Germantown, Pennsylvania in 1825. His portrait by Charles Willson Peale hangs in Independence National Historical Park in Philadelphia.

External links

Committee History can be found here: 
The Political Graveyard

1747 births
1825 deaths
Politicians from Philadelphia
People of colonial Pennsylvania
Federalist Party members of the United States House of Representatives from Pennsylvania
Continental Army officers from Pennsylvania